John Anthony "Rabbit" Barnhill (March 20, 1938 – November 11, 2013) was an American former professional basketball player.

Barnhill, along with Porter Meriwether, led the Evansville Lincoln High School Lions to an undefeated regular season and the city co-championship in 1954–55.

Born in Sturgis, Kentucky, the 6'1" guard was raised in Evansville, Indiana; he attended Tennessee State University, where he won an NAIA championships in 1957, 1958 and 1959. Barnhill's 1957 TSU Tigers were notable as the first all-black team to win a major American basketball tournament. Meriwether joined him in time for the 1959 title.

He finished his career as the #2 scorer (1,253 points) behind Dick Barnett on the all-time TSU scoring list; today, he ranks #18. He was a 3 time NAIA All-American (1957, 1958 and 1959) and helped the Tigers to a 3-year record of 94–8 (.922).

After his 1st season with the Pipers, he was selected for an American All-Star that toured the Soviet Union; other members of the U.S. State Department-sponsored team included Jerry Lucas, Les Lane, Dan Swartz, Ben Warley, Roger Taylor, Jack Adams, Mike Moran, Jerry Shipp, Gary Thompson, Jim Frances and Tom Meschery.

From 1962 to 1969, Barnhill played in the National Basketball Association as a member of the St. Louis Hawks, Detroit Pistons, Baltimore Bullets, and San Diego Rockets. He averaged 8.6 points per game in his NBA career. Barnhill later spent time in the rival American Basketball Association, mainly as a member of the Indiana Pacers.  Additionally, Barnhill was selected in three separate NBA expansion drafts in three consecutive years, 1966 (Chicago Bulls), 1967 (San Diego Rockets), and 1968 (Phoenix Suns).

Following his playing career, Barnhill was an NBA assistant coach for the Los Angeles Lakers, assisting Bill Sharman; he acted as the Lakers' interim coach during the 1974–75 season, while Sharman's wife was ill with cancer.

Notes

1938 births
2013 deaths
Amateur Athletic Union men's basketball players
American Basketball League (1961–62) players
American men's basketball players
Baltimore Bullets (1963–1973) players
Basketball players from Indiana
Chicago Bulls expansion draft picks
Cleveland Pipers players
Denver Rockets players
Detroit Pistons players
Indiana Pacers players
Phoenix Suns expansion draft picks
Point guards
San Diego Rockets expansion draft picks
San Diego Rockets players
Shooting guards
Sportspeople from Evansville, Indiana
St. Louis Hawks draft picks
St. Louis Hawks players
Tennessee State Tigers basketball players